Urubongs Rajsombhoj (15 October 1893 – 20 September 1909) was Prince of Siam (later Thailand). He was a son of Chulalongkorn of Siam. His mother was The Noble Consort (Chao Chom Manda) Luean Niyavananda, daughter of Lord (Phra) Narindrabhorn and Prik Niyavananda. His elder full sister, Princess Lavad Voraong, died in infancy.

As a child he joined his father on trips to many places, including Europe. Unlike the other princes, Urubongs was not educated in Europe, but instead received instruction from foreign teachers at a private residence in Siam.

He died on 20 September 1909, on King Chulalongkorn's birthday, at the age of 15. His death brought sadness to the members of the Royal Family, especially King Chulalongkorn. The king ordered the building of a bridge in the city with sculptures of Prince Urubongs set into both sides. King Chulalongkorn named the bridge after his son; Urubongs Bridge, where Urubongs Avenue crossed. This bridge was eventually demolished but Urubongs Road and Urubongs Intersection remain today.

Ancestry

1893 births
1909 deaths
19th-century Thai royalty who died as children
20th-century Thai royalty who died as children
Thai male Phra Ong Chao
Children of Chulalongkorn
19th-century Chakri dynasty
20th-century Chakri dynasty
Sons of kings